Calling Me Home may refer to:

Calling Me Home, a 2002 album by Alice Gerrard and its title song
Calling Me Home (Kathy Mattea album), a 2012 album by Kathy Mattea and its title song
Calling Me Home – The Best of Sara Storer (2010), the first compilation album by Australian country music singer Sara Storer
"Calling Me Home to You" (1916), an American song written by Edward Teschemacher and composed by Francis Dorel
They're Calling Me Home (2021), an album by Rhiannon Giddens with Francesco Turrisi